Kyle Mychal Randall (born September 10, 1991) is an American basketball coach and former professional basketball player who last played for the Delaware Blue Coats of the NBA G League.

College career
After playing high school basketball at Kennedy Catholic High School, in Hermitage, Pennsylvania, Randall played three seasons at the University of North Carolina at Greensboro before transferring to the Central Michigan University for his senior season. He averaged 18.3 points per game to lead the Mid-American Conference.

Professional career
Randall went undrafted in the 2013 NBA draft. In the 2013–14 season he played in the NBA Development League with the Fort Wayne Mad Ants and the Canton Charge.

For the 2014-15 season Randall moved to the Rochester Razorsharks of the Premier Basketball League.

On October 25, 2016, Randall signed with Serbian club Konstantin for the rest of the 2016–17 KLS season. In 13 games he averaged 16 points per game.

On October 31, 2017, Randall was acquired by the Lakeland Magic.

On February 16, 2018, Randall was acquired by the Delaware 87ers.

Coaching career
In August 2021, Randall was hired as the head girls basketball coach at R. A. Long High School.

Personal life
Randall's father L. Craig scored 1,503 career points at Westminster College while his mother Karla played collegiately at Kent State. His brother Lance played basketball at Thiel College, while his brother Craig played at Memphis and UT Martin before playing professionally in the G League.

References

External links
RealGM profile
NBA G League Statistics @ Basketball-Reference.com

1991 births
Living people
American expatriate basketball people in Serbia
American men's basketball players
Basketball League of Serbia players
Basketball players from Youngstown, Ohio
Canton Charge players
Central Michigan Chippewas men's basketball players
Delaware 87ers players
Delaware Blue Coats players
Fort Wayne Mad Ants players
High school basketball coaches in Washington (state)
Lakeland Magic players
OKK Konstantin players
Point guards
UNC Greensboro Spartans men's basketball players